The Cudgen Rugby League Football Club, more commonly known as the Cudgen Hornets, was formed in 1950 and plays at Ned Byrne Field at Kingscliff.  It competes in the Gold Coast Rugby League.

Cudgen Hornets Seniors compete in the Gold Coast/Tweed Bycroft Cup and fields teams in the age groups of Under 17's, Under 19's, Reserve Grade, and First Grade.  The Cudgen Juniors compete in the New South Wales Group 18 competition from under 7's through to under 16's.

Notable Juniors
Col Bentley (Penrith Panthers)
Jamie Mathiou (North Queensland Cowboys & Leeds Rhinos)
Max Bryant (2018- Brisbane Heat Cricket)
Matt Daylight (1995-01 Adelaide Rams & Gateshead Thunder)
Bill Dunn (Cronulla-Sutherland Sharks & Illawarra Steelers & Western Suburbs Magpies)
Matt Seers (North Sydney Bears & Wests Tigers)

See also

List of rugby league clubs in Australia

References

External links

1950 establishments in Australia
Rugby clubs established in 1950
Sport in Tweed Heads, New South Wales
Rugby league teams in New South Wales